Esteban is a Spanish male given name, derived from Greek Στέφανος (Stéphanos) and related to the English names Steven and Stephen. Although in its original pronunciation the accent is on the penultimate syllable, English-speakers tend to pronounce it as a proparoxytone  .

People with the given name
 Esteban Alvarado, Costa Rican goalkeeper
 Esteban Andrés Suárez, Spanish football goalkeeper
 Esteban Cambiasso, Argentine footballer
 Esteban de la Fuente, Argentine basketball player
 Esteban Fuertes, Argentine footballer
 Esteban Granero, Spanish footballer
 Esteban Guerrieri, Argentine racing driver
 Esteban Gutiérrez, Mexican racing driver
 Esteban Lazo Hernández, Cuban politician
 Esteban Loaiza, Mexican retired baseball player 
 Esteban Navarro, Spanish novelist
 Esteban Ocon, French racing driver
 Esteban Pérez, Argentine basketball player
 Esteban Solari, Argentine football player
 Esteban Trapiello, Venezuelan businessman
 Esteban Tuero, Argentine racing driver
 Esteban Valencia, Chilean footballer

Stage name
 Esteban (musician), stage name of guitarist Stephen Paul

Fictional characters
 Esteban, in the French-Japanese animated series The Mysterious Cities of Gold
 Esteban Ramírez, in American television sitcom The Suite Life of Zack & Cody

Spanish masculine given names